Abardeh Rural District is a rural district (dehestan) in Shandiz District, Torqabeh and Shandiz County, Razavi Khorasan Province, Iran. At the 2011 census, its population was 7,866, in 2,318 families. The rural district has 9 villages.

References 

Rural Districts of Razavi Khorasan Province
Torqabeh and Shandiz County